Tea and Sympathy is a 1953 stage play in three acts by Robert Anderson about a male private school student, Tom Lee, who faces accusations of homosexuality. A woman, Laura, who is married to an instructor, opposes the students' shaming of Lee and romantically pursues him so he can prove that he has a masculine character. The title refers to what someone in Laura's position was supposed to offer a boy such as Tom.

Everett Evans of the Houston Chronicle called it "one of the first plays to tackle the then-taboo topic of sexual orientation and related prejudice." Evans stated that the play's final line, "Years from now, when you speak of this, and you will, be kind," is "one of the most quoted curtain lines in stage history".

Characters
 Tom Lee – A student at a New England preparatory school who is accused of being effeminate and is targeted after sunbathing with a male professor.
 Bill Reynolds – The head of Tom Lee's dormitory house, Bill is hyper-masculine and in conflict with Tom. He prefers activities with the boys to spending time with his wife, Laura, from whom he is distant. Everett Evans of the Houston Chronicle wrote that Bill married Laura "apparently" because colleagues pressured him into doing so, and that "The play suggests Bill's persecution of Tom stems from doubts about his own masculinity."
 Laura Reynolds – Bill's wife, Laura assists Tom and helps him during his troubles.

Productions

Broadway
The play premiered on Broadway at the Ethel Barrymore Theatre on September 30, 1953, in a production by The Playwrights' Company, directed by Elia Kazan with scenic and lighting design by Jo Mielziner. The play starred Deborah Kerr, Leif Erickson, and John Kerr. It transferred to the Longacre Theatre, and later the 48th Street Theatre. The play closed on June 18, 1955 after 712 performances. In summer 1954, Joan Fontaine and Anthony Perkins replaced Deborah Kerr and John Kerr in their respective roles.

London
The play was first performed in London at the Comedy Theatre, now the Harold Pinter Theatre, under membership conditions, because the Lord Chamberlain had imposed an outright ban. The New Watergate Club was founded in 1956 for the staging of plays previously suppressed under the Theatres Act 1843. By these means, the theatre premiered Tea and Sympathy in the United Kingdom.

Paris
A French adaptation was presented in 1956 at the Théâtre de Paris, Paris, starring Ingrid Bergman and Jean-Loup Phillipe and directed by Jean Mercure.

Off-Broadway
The play was presented Off-Broadway by the Keen Company at the Clurman Theater, from March 6, 2007 to April 14, 2007. Directed by Jonathan Silverstein the cast featured Heidi Armbruster (Laura Reynolds), Dan McCabe (Tom Lee) and Craig Mathers (Bill Reynolds).

Adaptations
The play was adapted into a 1956 film. In 1956, Bob Thomas of the Associated Press wrote that "many said [the play] could never be made into a movie."

Reception

In 2013, Everett Evans of the Houston Chronicle wrote that "Sixty years on, this once controversial play is a little dated, but a lot more timely, its potent moments outweighing its imperfections. When you speak of 'Tea and Sympathy', be kind."

References

External links

Tea and Sympathy at Internet Broadway Database
Internet Movie Database

1953 plays
Broadway plays
Plays by Robert Woodruff Anderson
American plays adapted into films
LGBT theatre in the United States